Tørberget Church is a parish church of the Church of Norway in Trysil Municipality in Innlandet county, Norway. It is located in the village of Tørberget. It is the church for the Tørberget parish which is part of the Sør-Østerdal prosti (deanery) in the Diocese of Hamar. The brown, wooden church was built in a long church design in 1933 using plans drawn up by the  architect. The church seats about 150 people.

History
Planning for a new church in Tørberget began in the 1920s. A cemetery was established on the site on 3 August 1924. Soon after, people began pushing for a chapel to be built on the same site. The lead builders were Harald Brænd and Gj. Floden. Originally designed to be an annex chapel, the building was consecrated on 19 March 1933 with Crown Prince Olav and Crown Princess Märtha present. The event was marked with a plaque in front of the sacristy with the throne and the letters O and M on top. The building underwent a major restoration in 1977. In 1996, the chapel was upgraded to parish church status and at that time it was renamed as a church.

See also
List of churches in Hamar

References

Trysil
Churches in Innlandet
Long churches in Norway
Wooden churches in Norway
20th-century Church of Norway church buildings
Churches completed in 1933
1933 establishments in Norway